Mansa Cove is the  cove indenting for  the east coast of the small ice-free promontory forming the north extremity of Ioannes Paulus II Peninsula, western Livingston Island in the South Shetland Islands, Antarctica and ending up in Cape Shirreff.

The feature was descriptively named by the 1984–85 Chilean Antarctic Expedition from the stillness of its waters (‘Quiet Bay’ in Spanish).

Location

Maps
 Map 3. Cape Shirreff, ASPA No. 149: Breeding wildlife sites and human features. Punta Arenas: Instituto Antártico Chileno (INACH), 2004.
 L.L. Ivanov et al. Antarctica: Livingston Island and Greenwich Island, South Shetland Islands. Scale 1:100000 topographic map. Sofia: Antarctic Place-names Commission of Bulgaria, 2005.
 L.L. Ivanov. Antarctica: Livingston Island and Greenwich, Robert, Snow and Smith Islands. Scale 1:120000 topographic map. Troyan: Manfred Wörner Foundation, 2009.

References
Composite Antarctic Gazetteer.

Coves of Livingston Island